The Metropolitan City of Bologna is a metropolitan city in the Emilia-Romagna region, Italy. Its capital is de facto the city of Bologna, though the body does not explicitly outline it. It was created by the reform of local authorities (Law 142/1990) and established by the Law 56/2014, replacing the Province of Bologna. It has been operative since 1 January 2015.

The Metropolitan City is headed by the Metropolitan Mayor (Sindaco metropolitano) and by the Metropolitan Council (Consiglio metropolitano).

History
Remains of the Iron Age Villanovan culture were discovered near Bologna by archaeologists in 1853. The city was settled by the Etruscans and named Velzna, later Felsina. In the 6th century BCE, Felsina was known for its markets and trade. It was invaded by the Gallic Boii tribe in this period, who developed the agricultural output of the region. The Romans began their conquest of the region around 220 BCE and were successful by the 180s BCE; upon their capture of Felsina, it was renamed Bononia. After Rome fell in 476 CE and the region suffered barbarian invasions, Bononia was made a fortress.

The city was owned by Charlemagne but was given to the Holy See in 774. Later, the Holy Roman Empire controlled the city and it became known as Bologna. Bologna became a commune by 1114, but it desired independence and in 1176 it joined the Lombard League, an alliance opposed to the Holy Roman Empire's influence. Emperor Frederick I recognised its desire for independence and granted it some autonomy. It joined the Second Lombard League to defeat Frederick II in 1249. Bologna became part of the Papal States in 1506 and joined the Kingdom of Italy upon Italian unification in the 19th century.

The University of Bologna was founded in 1088; its speciality was Roman and canon law, and it set standards in the way it was organised and the curriculum that was followed by universities in Italy.

Geography
The Metropolitan City of Bologna is part of the region of Emilia-Romagna in northwestern Italy. It is in the centre of the region and is bounded on the east by the Province of Ravenna, while the Province of Ferrara lies to the north and the Province of Modena lies to the west. To the south are the Metropolitan City of Florence, the Province of Prato and the Province of Pistoia, all in the region of Tuscany.

Government

List of Metropolitan Mayors of Bologna

References

External links
Official website 

 
Bologna
Villanovan culture